Snydersville is an unincorporated community in Hamilton Township in Monroe County, Pennsylvania, United States. Snydersville is located at the intersection of U.S. Route 209 Business, Rimrock Road, Pensyl Creek Road, and Middle Easton Belmont Pike.

References

Unincorporated communities in Monroe County, Pennsylvania
Unincorporated communities in Pennsylvania